The 1991–92 NBA season was the 46th season for the Boston Celtics in the National Basketball Association. This marked the thirteenth and final NBA season for All-Star forward, and Celtics legend Larry Bird, who would retired after the season. Bird missed nearly half of the season due to a nagging back injury, only playing just 45 games. Midway through the season in January, the Celtics traded Brian Shaw to the Miami Heat in exchange for Sherman Douglas. The Celtics trailed the New York Knicks in the Atlantic Division for the first half of the season, holding a 28–18 record at the All-Star break. But a furious rally at the end of the season helped the Celtics finish with a 51–31 record, and claim the division title (and the #2 Eastern Conference seed, although since they finished six games behind the #3 seed Cleveland Cavaliers in record, Cleveland would have home court in a head-to-head playoff series). The Celtics also qualified for the playoffs for the thirteenth consecutive season.

One of the season highlights for Bird was a 49-point performance in a nationally televised double-overtime win over eventual Western Conference champion Portland Trail Blazers. It was the most points for Bird since February 15, 1988, when he scored 49 at Phoenix Suns. Bird averaged 20.2 points, 9.6 rebounds and 6.8 assists per game, while Reggie Lewis led the team with 20.8 points and 1.5 steals per game. Bird and Lewis were both selected for the 1992 NBA All-Star Game, but Bird did not play due to injury. In addition, Robert Parish averaged 14.1 points and 8.9 rebounds per game, and surpassed the 20,000 point mark, while sixth man Kevin McHale provided the team with 13.9 points and 5.9 rebounds per game off the bench, but only played 56 games due to a leg injury, Kevin Gamble provided with 13.5 points per game, and second-year guard Dee Brown contributed 11.7 points and 5.3 assists per game, but only played just 31 games due to a knee injury. Also, top draft pick Rick Fox was named to the NBA All-Rookie Second Team.

In the playoffs, the Celtics swept the Indiana Pacers in three straight games of the Eastern Conference First Round, then took a 2–1 series lead over the Cavaliers in the Eastern Conference Semi-finals, but lost in seven games. 

Following the loss, the Celtics would not win a playoff series for another ten years.

Draft picks

Roster

Regular season

Season standings

y – clinched division title
x – clinched playoff spot

z – clinched division title
y – clinched division title
x – clinched playoff spot

Record vs. opponents

Game log

Playoffs

|- align="center" bgcolor="#ccffcc"
| 1
| April 23
| Indiana
| W 124–113
| Reggie Lewis (32)
| Robert Parish (14)
| John Bagley (9)
| Boston Garden14,890
| 1–0
|- align="center" bgcolor="#ccffcc"
| 2
| April 25
| Indiana
| W 119–112 (OT)
| John Bagley (35)
| Robert Parish (14)
| John Bagley (15)
| Boston Garden14,890
| 2–0
|- align="center" bgcolor="#ccffcc"
| 3
| April 27
| @ Indiana
| W 102–98
| Reggie Lewis (32)
| Ed Pinckney (14)
| John Bagley (11)
| Market Square Arena16,530
| 3–0
|-

|- align="center" bgcolor="#ffcccc"
| 1 || May 2 || @ Cleveland
| L 76–101
| Kevin Gamble (22)
| Ed Pinckney (10)
| John Bagley (8)
| Richfield Coliseum17,496
| 0–1
|- align="center" bgcolor="#ccffcc"
| 2 || May 4 || @ Cleveland
| W 104–98
| Robert Parish (27)
| Robert Parish (8)
| John Bagley (11)
| Richfield Coliseum20,273
| 1–1
|- align="center" bgcolor="#ccffcc"
| 3 || May 8 || Cleveland
| W 110–107
| Reggie Lewis (36)
| Robert Parish (17)
| Reggie Lewis (7)
| Boston Garden14,890
| 2–1
|- align="center" bgcolor="#ffcccc"
| 4 || May 10 || Cleveland
| L 112–114 (OT)
| Reggie Lewis (42)
| Robert Parish (18)
| John Bagley (7)
| Boston Garden14,890
| 2–2
|- align="center" bgcolor="#ffcccc"
| 5 || May 13 || @ Cleveland
| L 98–114
| Reggie Lewis (27)
| Joe Kleine (11)
| John Bagley (5)
| Richfield Coliseum20,273
| 2–3
|- align="center" bgcolor="#ccffcc"
| 6 || May 15 || Cleveland
| W 122–91
| Reggie Lewis (26)
|  Dee Brown (8)
| Larry Bird (14)
| Boston Garden14,890
| 3–3
|- align="center" bgcolor="#ffcccc"
| 7 || May 17 || @ Cleveland
| L 104–122
| Reggie Lewis (22)
| Ed Pinckney (9)
| Bagley, Brown (5)
| Richfield Coliseum20,273
| 3–4
|-

Player statistics

Awards and records
 Rick Fox, NBA All-Rookie Team 2nd Team

Transactions

References

Boston Celtics seasons
Boston Celtics
Boston Celtics
Boston Celtics
Celtics
Celtics